Statistics of Emperor's Cup in the 1957 season.

Overview
It was contested by 16 teams, and Chuo University Club won the championship.

Results

1st Round
Shida Soccer 0–5 Keio BRB
Toyama Club 0–6 Kwangaku Club
Meiyu Club 1–1 (lottery) Kwangaku Club
Hiroshima Exclusive 0–2 Chuo University Club
All Hokkaido 0–7 All Waseda University
Kyoto Shiko 0–3 Toyo Industries
Tohoku Gakuin University 0–4 Yawata Steel
Tomioka Soccer 1–1 All Rikkyo

Quarterfinals
Keio BRB 1–3 Kwangaku Club
Kwangaku Club 1–2 Chuo University Club
All Waseda University 1–2 Toyo Industries
Yawata Steel 0–1 All Rikkyo

Semifinals
Kwangaku Club 0–0 (lottery) Chuo University Club
Toyo Industries 1–0 All Rikkyo

Final

Chuo University Club 2–1 Toyo Industries
Chuo University Club won the championship.

References
 NHK

Emperor's Cup
1957 in Japanese football